Softball at the 2013 Canada Summer Games was held in Sherbrooke, Quebec at Parc Bureau and Parc Desranleau.

The events will be held during the first week between August 3 and 9, 2013.

Medal table
The following is the medal table for cycling at the 2013 Canada Summer Games.

Medalists

Results

Qualification

Playoffs

References

2013 in softball
2013 Canada Summer Games
2013 Canada Games